Bringing Down the House is the soundtrack to Adam Shankman's 2003 comedy film Bringing Down the House. It was released on March 4, 2003 through Hollywood Records and mainly consisted of hip hop music. The soundtrack made it to 111 on the Billboard 200, 23 on the Top R&B/Hip-Hop Albums and 7 on the Top Soundtracks in the United States.

The only single released from the soundtrack was "Better Than the Rest" by the film's star Queen Latifah.

Track listing

Sample credits
Track 1 contains a sample of "Before I Let Go" by Frankie Beverly & Maze
Track 8 contains a sample of "Don't Look Any Further" by Dennis Edwards

Charts

References

External links

2003 soundtrack albums
Hip hop soundtracks
Rhythm and blues soundtracks
Hollywood Records soundtracks
Albums produced by JellyRoll
Albums produced by Just Blaze
Albums produced by the Neptunes
Comedy film soundtracks